Herbert Loxley (3 February 1934 – 9 October 2008) was an English footballer and manager. As a player, Loxley spent the majority of his career at Notts County, where he played more than 250 first-team games as a wing-half. Loxley made his debut for the Magpies during the 1954–55 season. In 1964, he left Notts County, and had a brief spell on the books of Mansfield Town.

Following a spell in non-league football, Loxley returned to the professional game in October 1966, when he joined Lincoln City as a member of the coaching staff. However, due to an injury crisis, Loxley had to resume his playing career, and played seven times for the Imps during the 1966–67 season.

In 1970, Loxley was appointed manager at Lincoln. He quit as manager in March 1971, and returned to his old job in the Lincoln coaching staff. He stayed with the club until 1987, and was awarded a testimonial in 1979–80 for his services to Lincoln City.

Loxley died in October 2008, following a long illness.

References

External links
Obituary (BBC)

1934 births
2008 deaths
English footballers
Lincoln City F.C. players
Mansfield Town F.C. players
Notts County F.C. players
English football managers
Lincoln City F.C. managers
People from Matlock, Derbyshire
Footballers from Derbyshire
Association football midfielders